Hapton railway station serves the village of Hapton  west of Burnley Central railway station on the East Lancashire Line operated by Northern. It is unmanned. Between 2004–5 and 2005–6, passenger usage fell by 21%, but in the years since, it has risen again by more than 60%.

The station has only basic facilities available, the standard plexiglass shelters, passenger information screens and PA system, with no permanent buildings. It is fully accessible for disabled travellers, via ramps from the nearby main road to each platform.

Services
Monday to Saturday, there is an hourly service from Hapton to Burnley and Colne (eastbound) and Preston via Accrington and Blackburn (westbound).

On 14 May 2012, Hapton became a request only stop, along with Huncoat, Burnley Barracks and Pleasington.

References

External links

Railway stations in Burnley
DfT Category F2 stations
Former Lancashire and Yorkshire Railway stations
Northern franchise railway stations
Railway request stops in Great Britain
Railway stations in Great Britain opened in 1860